Rising from Ashes is the fifth album by German power metal band Silent Force, released on December 13, 2013, via AFM Records. It is their first album since Walk the Earth in 2007. It was produced by Beyrodt himself and it was the first and only album also with singer Michael Bormann (Jaded Heart), bass guitarist Mat Sinner (Primal Fear, Voodoo Circle) and Italian keyboardist Alessandro Del Vecchio (Hardline, Jorn, Edge of Forever), respectively instead of D. C. Cooper (returned to Royal Hunt), Jürgen Steinmetz and Torsten Röhre.

The album was preceded by the single "Circle of Trust" on December 4, 2013.

Track listing
All songs written by Alex Beyrodt and Michael Bormann.

Personnel

Michael Bormann - vocals
Alex Beyrodt - guitars, producing
Mat Sinner - bass guitar
Alessandro Del Vecchio - keyboards
André Hilgers - drums

Additional personnel

Level 10 Music - management
Achim Köhler - mixing
Ubikmedia - video editing
Felipe Machado - cover
Hiko - artwork

References

2013 albums
Power metal albums by German artists